The Dornier Do 12 Libelle III ("Dragonfly III") was the third of a line of small German flying boats of the 1930s. It started with the Dornier A Libelle I and the Dornier A Libelle II, though the Do 12 was not a continuation, but an entirely new aircraft.

The aircraft was amphibious and would carry three to four passengers. It was powered by a single Argus As 10 engine initially, then a Gnome-Rhône 5Ke Titan engine, mounted above the wing. It first flew in 1932 and went on to be used by the DFS to tow gliders.

Design
The Do 12 was a high-wing monoplane, of usual Dornier all-metal construction, with a two-spar, trapezoidal wing, whose trailing edge was very strongly rounded at the root. The fuselage was of rectangular cross-section.

A storage area was in the nose, where equipment, including anchors, could be kept. Behind it, the open cockpit had two side-by-side seats, with optional dual controls. In the cabin, there were two more seats and a storage area, which could also be fitted with bunks for sleeping. Between the cockpit and cabin were nacelles which accommodated the retracted undercarriage wheels, a first for Dornier, which were lowered or raised manually by a crank. The engine sat on a stand high above the wing, alongside two fuel tanks, in pusher configuration.

From the first flight on 23 June 1932, and in the further course of testing, it was obvious that the Argus engine was underpowered, making takeoff distances substantially too long. However, financial difficulties in the company meant that fitting the stronger Gnome-Rhône Titan 5Ke took some time.

Father Paul Schulte, a missionary known as the "Flying Priest", used the Do 12 "D-INEZ" for many years and in his various books it plays an important role.

Variants
Do 12
powered by a Gnome-Rhône Titan 5Ke five-cylinder radial engine
Do 12A
powered by an Argus As 10 inverted V-8 engine

Specifications (Do 12)

See also

Notes

External links

 

1930s German civil utility aircraft
Flying boats
Do 012
Amphibious aircraft
Single-engined pusher aircraft
High-wing aircraft
Aircraft first flown in 1932